Cronia aurantiaca is a species of sea snail, a marine gastropod mollusk in the family Muricidae, the murex snails or rock snails.

Description

Distribution
This species occurs in the Southern Pacific Ocean off Australia.

References

 Hombron J.B. & Jacquinot H. (1848 [November]). Atlas d'Histoire Naturelle. Zoologie par MM. Hombron et Jacquinot, chirurgiens de l'expédition. in: Voyage au Pôle Sud et dans l'Océanie sur les corvettes l'Astrolabe et la Zélée pendant les années 1837-1838-1839-1840 sous le commandement de M. Dumont-D'Urville capitaine de vaisseau publié sous les auspices du département de la marine et sous la direction supérieure de M. Jacquinot, capitaine de Vaisseau, commandant de La Zélée. Vingt-cinquiéme livraison. Mollusques pls 14, 16, 19, 22; Insectes lépidoptéres pl. 3
In: Voyage au Pôle Sud et dans l'Océanie sur les corvettes l'Astrolabe et la Zélée, Zoologie, vol. 5, p. 1-118, 125-131 (Mollusques); 119-124, 131-132 (Zoophytes)

Gastropods described in 1853
Cronia